is a compilation album by Japanese singer/songwriter Mari Hamada, released on March 24, 1994, by MCA Victor to commemorate the 10th anniversary of her music career. The album compiles her singles and most popular songs from 1983 to 1994, with four songs re-recorded in acoustic versions for this release. It started Hamada's tradition of releasing an Inclination compilation on every 10th anniversary.

Inclination was Hamada's third and final No. 1 album on Oricon's albums chart. It was also certified Platinum by the RIAJ.

Track listing

Charts

Certification

References

External links 
 
 
 

1994 compilation albums
Japanese-language compilation albums
Mari Hamada compilation albums
Universal Music Japan albums